The following is the orders, decorations, and medals given by Sultan of Selangor. When applicable, post-nominal letters and non-hereditary titles are indicated.

Order of precedence for the wearing of order insignias, decorations, and medals 
Precedence:

Orders, decorations, and medals 
The Most Esteemed Royal Family Order of Selangor - Darjah Kerabat Selangor Yang Amat Dihormati
 Founded by Sultan Salahuddin Abdul Aziz Shah on 6 June 1961. 
 Awarded to members of the Selangor and other Royal families, and to high officers of state - in two classes :
 1. First Class - D.K. I
 2. Second Class - D.K. II

The Most Illustrious Order of the Crown of Selangor - Darjah Kebesaran Mahkota Selangor Yang Amat Mulia
 Founded by Sultan Salahuddin Abdul Aziz Shah on 6 June 1961 as a reward for general services to the sultan and state of Selangor. 
 Awarded in four classes :
 1. Knight Grand Commander or Dato’ Sri Paduka - S.P.M.S. 
 2. Knight Commander or Dato’ Paduka - D.P.M.S.
 3. Companion or Setia - S.M.S.
 4. Member or Ahli - A.M.S.

The Order of Sultan Sharafuddin Idris Shah - Darjah Kebesaran Sultan Sharafuddin Idris Shah
 Founded by Sultan Sharafuddin Idris Shah on 14 December 2002. 
 Awarded in four classes :
 1. Knight Grand Companion or Dato’ Sri Setia - S.S.I.S. 
 2. Knight Companion or Dato’ Setia - D.S.I.S. 
 3. Companion or Setia - S.I.S.
 4. Member or Ahli - A.I.S.

The Order of Sultan Salahuddin Abdul Aziz Shah - Darjah Kebesaran Sultan Salahuddin Abdul Aziz Shah
 Founded by Sultan Salahuddin Abdul Aziz Shah on 30 September 1985. 
 Awarded in four classes :
 1. Knight Grand Companion or Dato’ Sri Setia - S.S.S.A. 
 2. Knight Companion or Dato’ Setia - D.S.S.A.
 3. Companion or Setia - S.S.A.
 4. Member or Ahli - A.S.A.

Distinguished Service Star - Bintang Perkhidmatan Cemerlang
 Instituted by Sultan Salahuddin Abdul Aziz Shah in 1982 as a reward for distinguished services to the state, in the rank of officer or executive, or above. 
 Awarded in a single class, silver star - B.P.C.

Conspicuous Gallantry Medal - Pingat Keberanian Yang Terbilang
 Instituted by Sultan Hishamuddin Alam Shah in 1951 as a reward for supreme acts of gallantry within the borders of the Selangor state. 
 Awarded in a single class, silver medal - P.K.T.

Distinguished Conduct Medal - Pingat Pekerti Yang Terpilih
 Instituted by Sultan Hishamuddin Alam Shah in 1951 as a reward for acts of distinguished and gallant conduct within the state of Selangor. 
 Awarded in a single class, silver medal - P.P.T.

Meritorious Service Medal - Pingat Jasa Kebaktian
 Instituted by Sultan Hishamuddin Alam Shah in 1951 as a reward for meritorious services to the state, including resourcefulness, devotion to duty, long service, exceptional ability or exemplary conduct. 
 Awarded in a single class, silver medal - P.J.K.

Distinguished Service Medal - Pingat Perkhidmatan Cemerlang
 Instituted by Sultan Salahuddin Abdul Aziz Shah in 1982 as a reward for distinguished services to the state, by those in non-executive positions or below. 
 Awarded in a single class, silver medal - P.P.C.

Selangor Service Medal - Pingat Perkhidmatan Selangor
 Instituted by Sultan Salahuddin Abdul Aziz Shah in 1977 as a reward for long, meritorious and faithful service to the state of not less than twenty years. 
 Awarded in a single class, silver medal - P.P.S.

Coronation Medal 2003 - Pingat Kemahkotaan 20061961
 Instituted by Sultan Sharafuddin Idris Shah to commemorate his Coronation in 2003. 
 Awarded in a single class, silver medal.

Coronation Medal 1961 - Pingat Kemahkotaan 1961
 Instituted by Sultan Salahuddin Abdul Aziz Shah to commemorate his Coronation on 28 June 1961. 
 Awarded in a single class, silver medal.

Silver Jubilee Medal 1985 - Pingat Jubli Perak 1985
 Instituted by Sultan Salahuddin Abdul Aziz Shah to commemorate his Silver Jubilee in 1985. 
 Awarded in a single class, silver medal.

See also 

 Orders, decorations, and medals of the Malaysian states and federal territories#Selangor
 List of post-nominal letters (Selangor)

References 

 
Selangor